The 25th Massachusetts General Court, consisting of the Massachusetts Senate and the Massachusetts House of Representatives, met in 1804 and 1805 during the governorship of Caleb Strong. David Cobb served as president of the Senate and Harrison Gray Otis served as speaker of the House.

Senators

Representatives

See also
 8th United States Congress
 9th United States Congress
 List of Massachusetts General Courts

References

External links
 . (Includes data for state senate and house elections in 1804)
 
 
 

Political history of Massachusetts
Massachusetts legislative sessions
massachusetts
1804 in Massachusetts
massachusetts
1805 in Massachusetts